Jacinta Nielsen (born May 30, 1972) is a former New Zealand rugby union player. She debuted for the Black Ferns on 16 August 1997 against Australia at Dunedin. She was selected for the 1998 Women's Rugby World Cup squad.

She played club rugby for Alhambra-Union.

References

External links 

 Black Ferns Profile

1972 births
Living people
New Zealand women's international rugby union players
New Zealand female rugby union players